The following is a list of episodes of the television series Ice Pilots NWT. The show premiered on November 18, 2009 on History Television in Canada, in May 2011 on Quest in the UK, and on the National Geographic Channel in the US on April 22, 2011.

Seasons

Season 1 (2009–2010)

Season 2 (2011)

Season 3 (2011 - 2012)

Season 4 (2012 - 2013)

Season 5 (2013 - 2014)

Season 6 (2014)

See also
 Alaska Wing Men
 Flying Wild Alaska
 Ice Road Truckers

External links
Buffalo Airways website
Ice Pilots NWT website
Ice Pilots on Quest in the UK

References

Documentary television series about aviation
Ice Pilots